You're in the Army Now is a 1941 comedy film directed by Lewis Seiler and starring Jimmy Durante, Phil Silvers, Jane Wyman, and Regis Toomey.

It featured the longest kiss in film (lasting three minutes and five seconds), between Toomey and Wyman, until 1988.

The film's climactic gag, a cabin dangling over a cliff edge, appears to have been liberally borrowed from Charlie Chaplin's feature film The Gold Rush.

The film's copyright was renewed in 1969.

Cast

See also
1941 in film
 You're in the Navy Now, a 1951 comedy film

References

External links

1941 films
1940s English-language films
Warner Bros. films
World War II films made in wartime
1941 comedy films
Military humor in film
American comedy films
American black-and-white films
Films about the United States Army